David H. Adams is an American cardiac surgeon and the Marie-Josée and Henry R. Kravis Professor and Chairman of the Department of Cardiothoracic Surgery, Icahn School of Medicine at Mount Sinai Hospital in New York City.
Dr. Adams is a recognized leader in the field of heart valve surgery and mitral valve reconstruction. As director of Mount Sinai Mitral Valve Repair Center, he has set national benchmarks with >99% degenerative mitral valve repair rates, while running one of the largest valve repair programs in the United States.
Dr. Adams is the co-inventor of 2 mitral valve annuloplasty repair rings the Carpentier-McCarthy-Adams IMR ETlogix Ring and the Carpentier-Edwards Physio II Annuloplasty Ring, and is a senior consultant with royalty agreements with Edwards Lifesciences. He is also the inventor of the Tri-Ad Adams Tricuspid Annuloplasty ring with a royalty agreement with Medtronic.  He is a co-author with Professor Alain Carpentier of the benchmark textbook in mitral valve surgery Carpentier's Reconstructive Valve Surgery. He is also the National Co-Principal Investigator of the FDA pivotal trial of the Medtronic-CoreValve transcatheter aortic valve replacement device.

Biography
Adams is a cardiac surgeon at Mount Sinai Hospital in New York City, specializing in mitral valve repair. He is the author of over 800 publications, holds three patents (Patent number 7.959.673, 6.660.265 and 6.540.781) and is recognized as a leading surgeon scientist and medical expert, serving on the Editorial Boards of several medical journals, including the Annals of Thoracic Surgery and Cardiology. Adams is a highly sought speaker both nationally and internationally, and has developed one of the world's largest video libraries of techniques in valve reconstruction. He is co-director of the annual American College of Cardiology/American Association for Thoracic Surgery (AATS) Heart Valve Disease Summit, and the Director of the biennial AATS Mitral Conclave.
He received his undergraduate and medical education at Duke University and completed his internship and residency in general and cardiothoracic surgery at Brigham and Women's Hospital and at Harvard Medical School. Adams followed that with a fellowship in the Cardiothoracic Unit at Harefield Hospital in London under Professor Sir Magdi Yacoub. In addition, he completed a two-year research fellowship under Professor Morris Karnovsky in the Department of Pathology at Harvard Medical School. He later served at Brigham and Women's Hospital as the Associate Chief of Cardiac Surgery and Director of the Brigham Primate Xeno-transplant Laboratory. He has been Chairman of the Department of Cardiothoracic Surgery at Mount Sinai Hospital since 2002.

Scientific investigator
Adams' clinical interests include all aspects of heart valve surgery, with a special emphasis on mitral valve reconstruction.

Areas of research
Adams' major research interests include:

Investigation of Ischemic Mitral Regurgitation
Outcomes Related to Mitral Valve Repair
Novel Mitral Valve Repair Strategies

Past research honors include the Alton Ochsner Research Scholarship from the American Association for Thoracic Surgery and the Paul Dudley White Research Fellowship from the American Heart Association. He has also received honorary Professorships from Capital University in Beijing and Keio University in Tokyo.

Medical 'miracle'
In 2005 New York Magazine featured Adams as having performed "Medical Miracle #7" when, in 2004, he performed mitral valve surgery on actress Liana Pai, who was then six months pregnant with her first child.

Immediate surgery was required to address Pai's aggressive bacterial infection. A conventional surgical procedurearresting the heart during the operation, using a heart-and-lung machine, and following up with a regime of anti-clotting drugswould have terminated the actress's pregnancy. With an incision across Pai's breast bone, Adams drained blood from her heart into a reservoir where it could be oxygenated before being returned to the aorta. In the meantime, he replaced two valves, both too badly damaged to attempt reconstruction with time limited by lack of a heart-and-lung machine, with compatible organic tissuethereby eliminating the need for pregnancy-prohibiting anti-clotting drugs post-surgery.

"I was glad to be alive, of course, but until my baby was born, I wouldn't believe everything was okay... Ima came out perfect and healthy. She's healthy, headstrong, independent. Adams saved two lives at once."

Awards and honors
2009 Heart of New York Award for Achievement in Cardiovascular Science and Medicine, American Heart Association
Featured in New York Magazine's list of Best Doctors in 2002–2009 and as one of the "Top 100 Minimally Invasive Surgeons" in 2006.
2002 Marie-Josée and Henry R. Kravis Endowed Professor of Cardiothoracic Surgery, Mount Sinai School of Medicine
2001 Best Oral Presentation, International Society for Minimally Invasive Cardiac Surgery
2000 Honorary Professor of Surgery, Capital University of Medical Sciences, Beijing
1992 Alton Ochsner Research Scholar, The American Association for Thoracic Surgery
1987 National Research Service Award, National Institutes of Health
1986 Paul Dudley White Fellow, American Heart Association
1986 Research Fellowship Award, American Heart Association
1981 Alpha Omega Alpha
1981 International College of Surgeons Scholarship

Inventor 

Carpentier A, Adams DH, Adzich, WV. Degenerative valvular disease specific annuloplasty ring sets, Patent filed with U.S. Patent and Trademark Office March 16, 2012
Carpentier A, McCarthy P, Adams DH. Carpentier-McCarthy-Adams IMR ETlogix Annuloplasty Ring. Edwards Lifesciences Corporation, Irvine, CA 2004.
Chen RH, Adams DH. Fresh, cryopreserved, or minimally fixed cardiac valvular xenografts. Patent filed with the U.S. Patent and Trademark Office October 16, 2000.
Adams DH. Cryopreserved homografts having natural tissue sewing rings. Patent filed with the U.S. Patent and Trademark Office January 27, 1999.

Peer-reviewed articles 
Partial list:

References

External links 
 Mitral Valve Repair Reference Center at Mount Sinai Hospital
 Mitral Foundation
 High-definition (HD) videos of Mitral Valve Repair Surgery
 The Mitral Valve Question, U.S. News & World Report
 Surgical Techniques at Edwards Lifesciences
 Mount Sinai Hospital homepage
 See patient reviews, videos and research for Dr. David Adams, heart surgeon

Living people
American cardiac surgeons
Duke University alumni
Harvard Medical School alumni
Icahn School of Medicine at Mount Sinai faculty
Year of birth missing (living people)
Duke University School of Medicine alumni